Durandal was the name ship of her class of four destroyers built for the French Navy in the late 1890s.

Design and description
The Durandal class was the first class of destroyers built for the French Navy, and formed part of the 300-tonne type of destroyers, of which 55 ships of similar size and layout were built between 1897 and 1908. They were designed by the French specialist builder of torpedo vessels, Chantiers et Ateliers A. Normand, based on their  design, but enlarged and with a stronger hull.

Like all the 300 tonne destroyers, Durandal had a "turtleback" forecastle and a raised flying-deck aft. Two widely separated funnels were fitted.

Durandal had a gun armament of a single Canon de 65 mm Modèle 1891 gun on a raised platform around the ship's conning tower, and six /40 M1885 guns on the ship's beams. Two  torpedo tubes were fitted, with two spare torpedoes carried. She had a crew of four officers and 48 other ranks.

Construction and service
Durandal and sister ship  were ordered on 25 August 1896, and Durandal was launched at Normand's Le Havre shipyard on 11 February 1899. She reached a speed of  during sea trials on 4 July 1899.

In July 1902, Durandal took part in the 1902 French naval manoeuvres in the Mediterranean.

On the outbreak of the First World War, Durandal was based in the English Channel, deployed on anti-submarine duties.

Notes

Citations

Bibliography
 

 

 

Durandal-class destroyers
Ships built in France
1899 ships